The 125th Special Tactics Squadron is a special operations force unit serving as part of the 142nd Wing of the United States Air National Guard. They are based at the Portland Air National Guard Base in Portland, Oregon.

Mission
The squadron provides tactical air and ground integration force and the Air Force's special operations ground force leading global strike, personnel recovery operations and battlefield surgery.

The Special Tactics Squadron consist of:
Combat Controllers (CCT) - who are FAA-certified air traffic controllers and establish air control and provide combat support.
Pararescuemen (PJ) - primary mission is personnel recovery in hostile areas and are expert combat medical professionals.
Special Reconnaissance (SR) – Special Reconnaissance Airmen are trained in surveillance and reconnaissance, electronic warfare (EW), long-range precision engagement and target interdiction, small unmanned aircraft systems.

Members of the 125th Special Tactics Squadron are trained in numerous infiltration methods that include: static-line and military free-fall parachuting, scuba, small boats, all-terrain vehicles, mountain ski and hiking, rappelling and fast rope.

History
The 125th STS was officially constituted on 1 May 2005, and is one of only two Special Tactics Units in the Air National Guard. On 9 September 2006, the 244th Combat Communications Squadron was re-missioned creating the fully operational 125th Special Tactics Squadron in 2007 at Portland Air National Guard Base, Portland, Oregon.

See also

List of United States Air Force special tactics squadrons

References

External links
142nd Wing Host of 125th Special Tactics Squadron at Portland Air Base

Special Tactics Squadron 125
Special tactics squadrons of the United States Air Force
Portland International Airport
Military units and formations in Oregon